Professor Richard Barrie Rickards (1938–2009), was Emeritus Professor in Palaeontology and Biostratigraphy at the Department of Earth Sciences, Cambridge University and Life Fellow of Emmanuel College. He was best known for his work on Graptolites. He was also a well-respected angler, the author or co-author of 31 books on fishing, fish and their habitats and the role of angling in society, and was President of the National Association of Specialist Anglers and the Lure Anglers' Society.  

He died from cancer on 5 November 2009, but was active to the end, writing books on fishing and papers on graptolites from his hospital bed and pursuing new research when at home in remission.

Education and Academic Career

Barrie Rickards grew up in Leeds and Goole in Yorkshire. He held the following degrees: BSc, MA, PhD, ScD, and a DSc from the University of Hull.

Research

Barrie Rickards' work concentrated on the systematics and biodiversity of graptolites in the Palaeozoic. This led to a better understanding of their paleobiogeography and evolution, the manner of their recovery from mass extinctions, and a more precise understanding of Lazarus taxa, refugia and relict faunas.

Fishing

Barrie Rickards was one of the best-known and most successful pike anglers in Britain. He was a Founding Fellow of the Pike Anglers' Club, and was past President of the Pike Society, the Lure Anglers' Society and the Specialist Anglers' Alliance.

Selected publications

Barrie Rickards had written over 250 academic papers, 700 articles on fishing and some 30 books related to both fishing and palaeontology.

 Leggett, J.K., McKerrow, W.S., Cocks, L.R.M. & Rickards, R.B. 1981, "Periodicity in the early Palaeozoic marine realm ( British Isles).", Journal, Geological Society, vol. 138, no. 2, pp. 167–176.
 Cuerda, A.J., Rickards, R.B. & Cingolani, C. 1988, "A new Ordovician-Silurian boundary section in San Juan Province, Argentina, and its definitive graptolite fauna", Journal - Geological Society of London, vol. 145, no. 5, pp. 749–757.
 Rickards, R.B. 1995, "Utility and precision of Silurian graptolite biozones", Lethaia, vol. 28, no. 2, pp. 129–137.
 Rickards, R.B., Packham, G.H., Wright, A.J. & Williamson, P.L. 1995, "Wenlock and Ludlow graptolite faunas and biostratigraphy of the Quarry Creek district, New South Wales", Memoir - Association of Australasian Palaeontologists, vol. 17.
 Dean, W.T., Monod, O., Rickards, R.B., Demir, O. & Bultynck, P. 2000, "Lower Palaeozoic stratigraphy and palaeontology, Karadere-Zirze area, Pontus mountains, northern Turkey", Geological Magazine, vol. 137, no. 5, pp. 555–582.
 Rickards, R.B. 2002, "The graptolitic age of the type Ashgill Series (Ordovician), Cumbria, UK", Proceedings of the Yorkshire Geological Society, vol. 54, no. 1, pp. 1–16.
 Rickards, B. 2007, Richard Walker: Biography of an Angling Legend. Medlar Press, 320pp

Awards

 Lyell Medal, The Geological Society, 1997

References

External links
 Personal page on Emmanuel College's web site

1938 births
2009 deaths
20th-century British geologists
Deaths from cancer in England
Fellows of Emmanuel College, Cambridge
British fishers
Lyell Medal winners
Scientists from Yorkshire